John Corbett (1 January 1880 – 11 April 1945) was a New Zealand rugby union player. A forward, Corbett represented West Coast and Buller at a provincial level, and was a member of the New Zealand national side the All Blacks in 1905, selected from the West Coast.

He played 16 games for the All Blacks but did not appear in any test matches.

References

External links
 

1880 births
1945 deaths
People from Reefton
New Zealand rugby union players
New Zealand international rugby union players
West Coast rugby union players
Buller rugby union players
Rugby union forwards
Rugby union players from West Coast, New Zealand